Kalyanavasantam (also written as kalyanavasantham) is a rāgam in Carnatic music (musical scale of South Indian classical music). It is a janya rāgam (derived scale) from the 21st melakarta scale Keeravani. It is a janya scale, as it does not have all the seven swaras (musical notes) in the ascending scale. It is a combination of the pentatonic scale Chandrakauns of Hindusthani music and the sampurna raga scale Keeravani.

Structure and Lakshana 

Kalyanavasantam is an asymmetric rāgam that does not contain rishabham or panchamam in the ascending scale. It is an audava-sampurna rāgam (or owdava rāgam, meaning pentatonic ascending scale). Its  structure (ascending and descending scale) is as follows:

 : 
 : 

The notes used in this scale are shadjam, sadharana gandharam, shuddha madhyamam, shuddha dhaivatham and kakali nishadham in ascending scale, with panchamam and chathusruthi rishabham included in descending scale. For the details of the notations and terms, see swaras in Carnatic music.

Popular compositions
There are a few compositions set to Kalyanavasantam rāgam. Here are some popular kritis composed in Kalyanavasantam.

Nadaloludai and Kanulu takani composed by Tyagaraja
Saagarasuthaam Aaradhyaye composed by Kalyani Varadarajan
Innudaya Baarade composed by Purandara Dasa
Sri Ranganatha Pahimam composed by Jayachamaraja Wodeyar
Gaanamalinchi composed by M. Balamuralikrishna
Deva Jagannatha composed by Gopalakrishna bharathi

Film Songs

Language:Tamil

Language:Malayalam

Related rāgams 
This section covers the theoretical and scientific aspect of this rāgam.

Scale similarities 
Chandrakauns has a symmetric pentatonic scale, with the notes same as the ascending scale of Kalyanavasantham. Its  structure is S G2 M1 D1 N3 S : S N3 D1 M1 G2 S

Notes

References

Janya ragas